During the 2003–04 season Cardiff City played in Division One of the Football League. It was the team's first year in the Division One since being promoted from Division Two.

Squad

|}

Transfers

Summer transfers in

Summer transfers out

Loans In

January Transfers In

January Transfers Out

Standings

Results by round

Fixtures and results

Division One

League Cup

FA Cup

FAW Premier Cup

See also 
 List of Cardiff City F.C. seasons
 2003–04 in English football

References 

Cardiff City F.C. seasons
Cardiff City
Cardiff City